John Grannary, also spelled Grannery, (February 14, 1884 – June 30, 1928) was a Canadian professional ice hockey player. He played with the Quebec Hockey Club of the National Hockey Association from the 1909–10 season through to the 1911–12 season.  Grannary won the Stanley Cup with Quebec in 1912

References

External links
Jack Grannery at JustSportsStats

1884 births
1928 deaths
Canadian ice hockey forwards
Ice hockey people from Quebec
Quebec Bulldogs (NHA) players